Homelix liturata is a species of beetle in the family Cerambycidae. It was described by Quedenfeldt in 1882. It is known from Tanzania, Angola, the Republic of the Congo, the Democratic Republic of the Congo, and possibly from the Ivory Coast.

References

Phrynetini
Beetles described in 1882